San Blas Bay (Maltese: Il-Bajja ta' San Blas) is a small beach located in Gozo, Malta. The beach mostly consists of a fine, reddish sand. The bay is known for its desolateness and subsequent lack of intrusion. The road leading to it is also famously known to be very badly maintained.

References 

Bays of Malta
Beaches of Malta